Para Pencari Tuhan is an Indonesian television series. It is first aired on 16 September 2007. The show currently has 15 seasons. It is aired only every Holy month of Ramadan, during suhur on 03:00–04:30 WIB in Season 1–6, and 03:00–04:00 WIB in Season 7–present and during iftar on 18:00–19:00 WIB (in Season 1–6 and season 13). This show also features a Telequiz. As of 2021, The series had 394 episodes.

The fifteenth season premiered with the title Ke Surga, Yuk! on 3 April 2022 to 1 May 2022. Starring Deddy Mizwar, Lavicky Nicholas, Dinda Kirana and Dea Lestari.

Plot
The series focuses on three ex-criminals, Chelsea, Barong, and Juki who have recently been released from prison. Later, they meet Bang Jack (portrayed by Deddy Mizwar).

Cast

Season 1 
Deddy Mizwar as Ahmad Zakaria
Melky Bajaj as Chelsea
Aden Bajaj as Barong
Isa Bajaj as Juki
Zaskia Adya Mecca as Aya
Artta Ivano as Kalila
Akrie Patrio as Ustad Fery
Annisa Suci as Haifah
Agus Kuncoro as Azam
Idrus Madani as Idrus (Pak RW)
Irma Annisa as Bu Jalal
Udin Nga Nga as Zulfikar Baharuddin (Udin)
Jarwo Kwat as  Ahmad Jalaluddin (Jalal)
Turaekhan Roy as Roy
Joes Terpase as Joes
Hakim Ahmad as Hakim
Asrul Dahlan as Asrul
Deliana Siahaan as Juki's mother.
Aty Cancer Zein as Febri's grandmother

Season 2 
Deddy Mizwar as Ahmad Zakaria
Melky Bajaj as Chelsea
Aden Bajaj as Barong
Isa Bajaj as Juki
Zaskia Adya Mecca as Aya
Artta Ivano as Kalila
Akrie Patrio as Ustad Fery
Annisa Suci as Haifah
Tora Sudiro as Baha
Agus Kuncoro as Azam
Idrus Madani as Idrus (Pak RW)
Irma Annisa as Bu Jalal
Udin Nga Nga as Zulfikar Baharuddin (Udin)
Jarwo Kwat as  Ahmad Jalaluddin (Jalal)
Turaekhan Roy as Roy
Joes Terpase as Joes
Hakim Ahmad as Hakim
Asrul Dahlan as Asrul
Deliana Siahaan as Juki's mother

Season 3 
Deddy Mizwar as Ahmad Zakaria
Melky Bajaj as Chelsea
Aden Bajaj as Barong
Isa Bajaj as Juki
Zaskia Adya Mecca as Aya
Tora Sudiro as Baha
Artta Ivano as Kalila
Akrie Patrio as Ustad Fery
Annisa Suci as Haifah
Agus Kuncoro as Azam
Idrus Madani as Idrus (Pak RW)
Irma Annisa as Bu Jalal
Udin Nga Nga as Zulfikar Baharuddin (Udin)
Jarwo Kwat as  Ahmad Jalaluddin (Jalal)
Turaekhan Roy as Roy
Joes Terpase as Joes
Hakim Ahmad as Hakim
Asrul Dahlan as Asrul
Deliana Siahaan as Juki's mother

Season 4 
Deddy Mizwar as Ahmad Zakaria
Melky Bajaj as Chelsea
Aden Bajaj as Barong
Isa Bajaj as Juki
Zaskia Adya Mecca as Aya
Artta Ivano as Kalila
Akrie Patrio as Ustad Fery
Annisa Suci as Haifah
Agus Kuncoro as Azam
Idrus Madani as Idrus (Pak RW)
Irma Annisa as Bu Jalal
Udin Nga Nga as Zulfikar Baharuddin (Udin)
Jarwo Kwat as  Ahmad Jalaluddin (Jalal)
Turaekhan Roy as Roy
Joes Terpase as Joes
Hakim Ahmad as Hakim
Asrul Dahlan as Asrul
Deliana Siahaan as Juki's mother

Season 5 
Deddy Mizwar as Ahmad Zakaria
Melky Bajaj as Chelsea
Aden Bajaj as Barong
Isa Bajaj as Juki
Zaskia Adya Mecca as Aya
Artta Ivano as Kalila
Akrie Patrio as Ustad Fery
Annisa Suci as Haifah
Agus Kuncoro as Azam
Idrus Madani as Idrus (Pak RW)
Irma Annisa as Bu Jalal
Udin Nga Nga as Zulfikar Baharuddin (Udin)
Jarwo Kwat as  Ahmad Jalaluddin (Jalal)
Turaekhan Roy as Roy
Joes Terpase as Joes
Hakim Ahmad as Hakim
Asrul Dahlan as Asrul
Henidar Amroe as Widya
Erma Zarina as Loli
Deliana Siahaan as Juki's mother

Season 6 
Deddy Mizwar as Ahmad Zakaria
Melky Bajaj as Chelsea
Aden Bajaj as Barong
Isa Bajaj as Juki
Zaskia Adya Mecca as Aya
Artta Ivano as Kalila
Akrie Patrio as Ustad Fery
Annisa Suci as Haifah
Agus Kuncoro as Azam
Idrus Madani as Idrus (Pak RW)
Irma Annisa as Bu Jalal
Udin Nga Nga as Zulfikar Baharuddin (Udin)
Jarwo Kwat as  Ahmad Jalaluddin (Jalal)
Turaekhan Roy as Roy
Joes Terpase as Joes
Hakim Ahmad as Hakim
Asrul Dahlan as Asrul
Asrul Dahlan as Asrul
Henidar Amroe as Widya
Erma Zarina as Loli
Slamet Rahardjo as Wijoyo
Vitta Mariana as Heli
Alfie Alfandy as Domino Febrianto
Deliana Siahaan as Juki's mother

Season 7 
Deddy Mizwar as Ahmad Zakaria
Melky Bajaj as Chelsea
Aden Bajaj as Barong
Isa Bajaj as Juki
Zaskia Adya Mecca as Aya
Artta Ivano as Kalila
Akrie Patrio as Ustad Fery
Annisa Suci as Haifah
Agus Kuncoro as Azam
Idrus Madani as Idrus (Pak RW)
Irma Annisa as Bu Jalal
Udin Nga Nga as Zulfikar Baharuddin (Udin)
Jarwo Kwat as  Ahmad Jalaluddin (Jalal)
Turaekhan Roy as Roy
Joes Terpase as Joes
Hakim Ahmad as Hakim
Asrul Dahlan as Asrul
Henidar Amroe as Widya
Erma Zarina as Loli
Slamet Rahardjo as Wijoyo
Vitta Mariana as Heli
Deliana Siahaan as Juki's mother

Season 8 
Deddy Mizwar as Ahmad Zakaria
Melky Bajaj as Chelsea
Aden Bajaj as Barong
Isa Bajaj as Juki
Zaskia Adya Mecca as Aya
Artta Ivano as Kalila
Akrie Patrio as Ustad Fery
Annisa Suci as Haifah
Agus Kuncoro as Azam
Idrus Madani as Idrus (Pak RW)
Irma Annisa as Bu Jalal
Udin Nga Nga as Zulfikar Baharuddin (Udin)
Jarwo Kwat as  Ahmad Jalaluddin (Jalal)
Turaekhan Roy as Roy
Joes Terpase as Joes
Hakim Ahmad as Hakim
Asrul Dahlan as Asrul
Henidar Amroe as Widya
Erma Zarina as Loli
Slamet Rahardjo as Wijoyo
Vitta Mariana as Heli
Alfie Alfandy as Domino Febrianto
Deliana Siahaan as Juki's mother

Season 9 
Deddy Mizwar as Ahmad Zakaria
Melky Bajaj as Chelsea
Aden Bajaj as Barong
Isa Bajaj as Juki
Zaskia Adya Mecca as Aya
Artta Ivano as Kalila
Akrie Patrio as Ustad Fery
Annisa Suci as Haifah
Agus Kuncoro as Azam
Idrus Madani as Idrus (Pak RW)
Irma Annisa as Bu Jalal
Udin Nga Nga as Zulfikar Baharuddin (Udin)
Jarwo Kwat as  Ahmad Jalaluddin (Jalal)
Turaekhan Roy as Roy
Joes Terpase as Joes
Hakim Ahmad as Hakim
Asrul Dahlan as Asrul
Henidar Amroe as Widya
Erma Zarina as Loli
Slamet Rahardjo as Wijoyo
Vitta Mariana as Heli
Alfie Alfandy as Domino Febrianto
Deliana Siahaan as Juki's mother

Season 10 
Deddy Mizwar as Ahmad Zakaria
Melky Bajaj as Chelsea
Aden Bajaj as Barong
Isa Bajaj as Juki
Asrul Dahlan as Asrul
Zaskia Adya Mecca as Aya
Artta Ivano as Kalila
Akrie Patrio as Ustad Fery
Annisa Suci as Haifah
Agus Kuncoro as Azam
Idrus Madani as Idrus / Pak RW
Irma Annisa as Bu Jalal
Udin Nga Nga as Zulfikar Baharuddin (Udin)
Jarwo Kwat as Ahmad Jalaluddin
Turaekhan Roy as Roy
Joes Terpase as Joe
Hakim Ahmad as Hakim
Teddy Syah as Azmi
Jaja Mihardja as Haji Jaja
Inneke Koesherawati as Dewi

Season 11 
Deddy Mizwar as Ahmad Zakaria
Zaskia Adya Mecca as Aya
Asrul Dahlan as Asrul
Artta Ivano as Kalila
Akrie Patrio as Ustad Fery
Annisa Suci as Haifah
Agus Kuncoro as Azam
Idrus Madani as Idrus / Pak RW
Irma Annisa aa Bu Jalal
Udin Nga Nga as Zulfikar Baharuddin (Udin)
Jarwo Kwat as Ahmad Jalaluddin
Turaekhan Roy as Roy
Joes Terpase as Joe
Asrul Dahlan as Asrul
Hakim Ahmad as Hakim
Henidar Amroe as Widya
Slamet Rahardjo as Wijoyo
Vitta Mariana as Heli
Alfie Alfandy as Domino Febrianto
Nurul Qomar as Haji Balotelli

Season 12 
Deddy Mizwar as Ahmad Zakaria (Bang Jack)
Deddy Mizwar as H. Husin Tabi'at
Deddy Mizwar as Nagabonar
Miqdad Addausy as Viral 
Nadya Fricella as Hera 
Irfan Siagian as Maing
Rochman as Sukarni Bombi Yusenberg
Totos Rasiti as Atep
Asrul Dahlan as Asrul
Ujang Ronda as Ajung
Nurul Qomar as Abah Nyinyi 
Dimas Anggara as Fadhli 
Dina Lorenza as Nurlaela 
Sania Velova as Putri
Silvia Anggraini as Alya 
Asrul Dahlan as Asrul

Season 13 
Deddy Mizwar as Ahmad Zakaria (Bang Jack)
Syakir Daulay as Ustad David
Betari Ayu as Zahro
Yasamin Jasem as Alexandria
Asrul Dahlan as Asrul
Bella Nurmala as Sifa
Adinda Dei as Ocie
Andi Annisa as Anna
Arman Hidayat as Sobirin
Agung Putra Prawira Nugraha as Apip
Kukuh Prasetya as Bahrudin
Silvia Anggraini as Alya
Ozzol Ramdan as Vegetable vendors
Miqdad Addausy as Viral 
Irfan Siagian as Maing
Rochman as Sukarni Bombi Yusenberg
Totos Rasiti as Atep
Ujang Ronda as Ajung

Season 14 
Deddy Mizwar as Ahmad Zakaria (Bang Jack)
Syakir Daulay as Ustad David
Betari Ayu as Zahro
Asrul Dahlan as Asrul
Yasamin Jasem as Alexandria
Angel Lisandi Putri as Putri Sandi Angel
Linda Ramadhanty as Asma
Edwin Superbejo as Kunang
Ery Makmur as Ipong
Alodya Desi as Mulan Safira
Vizza Dara as Maya Estira
Meriel Jessica as Pepi
Unang as Kardiman
Miqdad Addausy as Viral  
Nadya Fricella as Hera
Irfan Siagian as Maing
Rochman as Sukarni Bombi Yusenberg
Totos Rasiti as Atep
Ujang Ronda as Ajung
Ingrid Widjanarko as Grandma

Season 15 
Deddy Mizwar as Ahmad Zakaria (Bang Jack)
Asrul Dahlan as Asrul
Lavicky Nicholas as Habib
Dea Lestari as Lara
Salma Paramitha as Bulan
Dinda Kirana as Matahari
Tio Pakusadewo as Galaxy
Bima Sena as Ali Verpool
Opie Kumis as Amor
Ridwan Ghani as Soni
Ira Wibowo as Karmila
Yurike Prastika as Mak Dharti
Andre Taulany as Deo
Arswendi Nasution as Nasib
Cok Simbara as Netral
Maudy Koesnaedi as Nurjannah
Tohir Jokasmo as Tohir
Sakurta Ginting as Joni Sakura

Special appearances 
Aty Cancer Zein as Febri's grandmother
Hafifi TB as Hafifi 
Dara Rulyant as Dara 
Benk Benk as motorcycle taxis driver
Anggia Jelita as Marni 
Linda Leona as Linda 
Yanto Tampan as Acip 
Junaedi as Junaedi 
Mira Zayra as Mira 
Juk Ng as Juk Ng
Agus Wibowo as Agus

Productions

Development 
Prior to the thirteenth season, Deddy Mizwar said that many actors, such as Idrus Madani and Agus Kuncoro, stopped appearing because they moved to another production houses. Deddy also believed that it would be hard to insert old characters into a new story when their arc have ended. A similar sentiment was expressed by Deddy before the fifteenth season; he said that the story arc for old characters would revolve around the same theme all over again.

Casting 
In thirteenth to fourteenth season, Syakir Daulay were cast to play Ustad David. Betari Ayu to portray Zahro. Yasamin Jasem was selected to portray Alexandria.

In fifteenth season, Lavicky Nicholas was roped in to play Habib. Dinda Kirana was chosen to play Matahari. Dea Lestari and Tio Pakusadewo was cast to play Lara and Galaxy. Maudy Koesnaedi was cast as Nurjannah. Andre Taulany joined the cast as Deo.

Reception

Viewership
According to AGB Nielsen data, the first season of Para Pencari Tuhan gained 32% share in average dan was watched by nearly all age demographics.

SCTV's public relations said that Para Pencari Tuhan third season gained 20.7% share per episode.

Awards and nominations

References

Indonesian television series
2007 Indonesian television series debuts
Ramadan special television shows